The Office of the Historian is an office of the United States Department of State within the Foreign Service Institute. It is legally responsible for the preparation and publication of the official historical documentary record of U.S. foreign policy in the Foreign Relations of the United States series, which can be accessed at its website. It researches and writes historical studies on aspects of U.S. diplomacy for use by policymakers and the public.

The office makes recommendations to other bureaus regarding the identification, maintenance, and long-term preservation of important historical diplomatic records. Its outreach activities include participating in the planning and installation of the historical components of the department's planned United States Center for Diplomacy, counseling private scholars and journalists on historical research issues, and responding to government and public inquiries on diplomatic history questions.

List of Directors of the Office of the Historian
 Gaillard Hunt 1919–1924
 Harry Dwight 1924
 Tyler Dennett 1924–1931
 David Hunter Miller 1931–1933
 Cyril Wynne 1933–1939
 E. Wilder Spaulding 1939–1946
 George Bernard Noble 1946–1962
 William Franklin 1962–1974
 Fredrick Aandahl (acting) 1975–1976
 David Trask 1976–1981
 William Slany 1981–2000
 Marc J. Susser 2001–2009
 John Campbell (acting) July 2009–September 2009
 Edward P. Brynn (acting) 2009–2012
 Stephen Randolph 2012–2017
 Adam Howard & Renée Goings (co-directors pro tempore) 2018–2019
 Adam Howard 2019–present

References

External links
 

Foreign relations of the United States
Historiography of the United States
Historian
United States Department of State agencies